HH 111 is a Herbig-Haro object in the L1617 dark cloud of the Orion B molecular cloud in the constellation of Orion. It is a prototype of a highly collimated optical jet sources. It shows several bow shocks and has a length of about 2.6 light-years (0.8 parsec).

HH 111 is about 1300 light years (400 parsec) distant from earth and the central source is IRAS 05491+0247, also called VLA 1. This source is the driving source of the jets and it is a class I protostar with a luminosity of about 25 . This protostar is embedded in a 30  cloud core. The dynamical age of the complex is only 800 years. Near the central source an ammonia feature called NH3-S was found, which is a starless core with a turbulent interior induced by HH 111.

The jets move with a speed of 300 - 600 km/s and consist of a blueshifted component, which is bright in optical wavelengths and a redshifted faint counterjet. A second pair of bipolar jets, called HH 121 was discovered in the near-infrared at an angle of 61° compared to the HH 111 pair. This was taken as evidence for a system with multiple protostars.

Gallery

References

External links

 Animations of HH object jets from HST observations
 Geometry of the multiple star system (from 2000)

Herbig–Haro objects
Orion (constellation)
Orion molecular cloud complex